The 1973–74 Football League Cup was the 14th season of the Football League Cup, a knockout competition for England's top 92 football clubs.

Wolverhampton Wanderers won the competition by defeating Manchester City 2–1 in the final on 2 March 1974. This triumph gave them entry to the 1974–75 UEFA Cup.

First round
The 56 Football League clubs who had comprised the Third and Fourth Divisions during the previous season, plus the bottom eight of the Second Division, all competed from the first round. Ties were straight knockout games, with additional replays if required. The original games were staged on 28–29 August 1973.

Ties

Replays

Second round
The 28 first round winners were joined by the remaining clubs from the Second Division and all from the First Division. Ties were straight knockout games, with additional replays if required. The original games were staged on 2/8–10 October 1973.

Ties

Replays

2nd Replays

1 At Old Trafford, Manchester

Third round
Ties were straight knockout games, with additional replays if required. The original games were staged on 30–31 October and 6 November 1973.

Ties

Replays

Fourth round
Ties were straight knockout games, with additional replays if required. The original games were staged on 20–21 and 27 November 1973.

Ties

Replays

Fifth round
Ties were straight knockout games, with additional replays if required.

Replay

Replay

Semi-finals
Ties were two-legged affairs with the winners advancing to the final. Extra time and then penalties would be used in the second leg if required.

First leg

Second leg

Wolverhampton Wanderers won 2–1 on aggregate

Manchester City won 3–1 on aggregate

Final

References

General

Specific

EFL Cup seasons
1973–74 domestic association football cups
Lea
Cup